Rajadhani Institute of Engineering & Technology (RIET), established in 2009, is a private self-financing technical institution at Nagaroor, Thiruvananthapuram, India. It is affiliated to APJ Abdul Kalam Technological University, and is approved by the All India Council for Technical Education.

Courses
The college offers the following graduate and postgraduate courses:
B.Tech Degree courses:
  Aeronautical Engineering (600 seats)
  Civil Engineering (120 seats)
  Computer Science and Engineering (60 seats)
  Electronics and Communication Engineering (60 seats)
  Electrical and Electronics Engineering (60 seats)
  Mechanical Engineering (120 seats)
Robotics and Automation (60 seats)
Cybersecurity (60 seats)

Postgraduate level:
  Structural Engineering  (18 Seats)
  Geo-Technical Engineering   (18 seats)
Polytechnic

Electrical and Electronics Engineering (60 seats)
Mechanical Engineering (60 seats)
Civil engineering (60 seats)
Automobile Engineering (60 seats)
Computer Technology (60 seats)

Start-ups 
Rajadhani Institute Of Engineering And Technology was successful in promoting the technical as well as the entrepreneurial mindset in the students. Examples are:
 Travancore Majestic
 Rajadhani Hi-Tech Equipments 
 CE SQUARE
 KARMA RESEARCH LAB
 E4S (Engineering 4 solutions)
.AST

References

External links 
 

 Private engineering colleges in Kerala
 Engineering colleges in Thiruvananthapuram
 Colleges affiliated to the University of Kerala
 Educational institutions established in 2009
2009 establishments in Kerala